William "Bill" James LeMessurier, Jr. (June 12, 1926 – June 14, 2007) was a prominent American structural engineer.

Early life and education 

Born in Pontiac, Michigan, Bill was the youngest of four children of Bertha (Sherman) and William James LeMessurier Sr., owners of a dry cleaning business. After finishing high school, he left Michigan to major in Mathematics at Harvard College. He graduated with an AB in Mathematics in 1947, then went to Harvard Graduate School of Design. He later transferred to the Massachusetts Institute of Technology where he earned his Master's Degree in building engineering and construction in 1953.

Career 

While at MIT, LeMessurier worked for Albert Goldberg, an established Boston structural engineer; eventually LeMessurier became a partner and the firm was renamed Goldberg-LeMessurier Associates. In April 1961, the two separated and Bill launched his firm LeMessurier Consultants. 

LeMessurier was responsible for the structural engineering on a large number of prominent buildings, including Boston City Hall, the Federal Reserve Bank of Boston, the Singapore Treasury Building, and the Dallas Main Center.

LeMessurier is perhaps best known for his role during the Citicorp Center engineering crisis, when he secretly reassessed his calculations on the Citicorp headquarters tower in New York City after the building had been finished in 1977. In June 1978, Princeton University engineering student Diane Hartley contacted LeMessurier's office after she identified winds that could topple the building under certain circumstances. Later, another young student, Lee deCarolis, prompted LeMessurier to redo his analysis. He discovered that the contractor had replaced the required welded joints with lower-cost, and potentially weaker bolted joints. This weakness could contribute to the building collapsing in "quartering" winds. This realization triggered a hurried, clandestine retrofit which was described in a 1995 article in The New Yorker entitled "The Fifty-Nine-Story Crisis". The case is now an ethical case-study in architectural degree programs.

Awards  
He was awarded the AIA Allied Professions Medal in 1968, elected to the National Academy of Engineering in 1978, elected an honorary member of the American Institute of Architects in 1988, and elected an honorary member of the American Society of Civil Engineers (ASCE) in 1989. In 1999, he received the American Institute of Steel Construction's J. Llloyd Kimbrough Award, its highest honor. In 2004, he was elevated to National Honor Member of Chi Epsilon, the national civil engineering honor society.

Death 
LeMessurier died in Casco, Maine on June 14, 2007 as a result of complications after surgery he underwent on June 1 after a fall the day before.

See also
LeMessurier Consultants

References

External links
 LeMessurier's site
 Boston Globe William LeMessurier Obituary
 Brief Slate article on the Citicorp building
 Article about the potential problem caused by poor decisions made by contractors working on the Citicorp building.
 MIT article
 OnlineEthics.org article
 (Re)examining the Citicorp Case: Ethical Paragon or Chimera

1926 births
2007 deaths
American structural engineers
People from Casco, Maine
People from Pontiac, Michigan
Harvard College alumni
Harvard Graduate School of Design alumni
Massachusetts Institute of Technology School of Science alumni
20th-century American engineers